{{Speciesbox
| image = Vexillum leucozonias 001.jpg
| image_caption = Shell of Vexillum leucozonias (holotype at the Smithsonian Institution)
| taxon = Vexillum leucozonias
| authority = (Deshayes in Laborde, 1834)
| synonyms_ref =
| synonyms =
 Mitra batista J. Cate, 1963
 'Mitra cineracea Reeve, 1845
 Mitra leucozonias Deshayes, 1833 (original combination)
 Mitra moana J. M. Cate, 1963 
 Vexillum (Costellaria) leucozonias <small>(Deshayes, 1833)</small
 Vexillum cinereum [sic] 
|display_parents= 3
}}Vexillum leucozonias'' is a species of small sea snail, marine gastropod mollusk in the family Costellariidae, the ribbed miters.

Description
The length of the shell attains 11 mm.

Distribution
This species occurs in the Red Sea, off Mozambique; off the Society Islands, the Solomon Islands and Tuamotus.

References

External links
 Deshayes, G. P. (1833). [Coquilles de la Mer Rouge in L. de Laborde, Voyage de l'Arabie Pétrée par Léon de Laborde et Linant. Giard, Paris. 87 pp, 69 pl., 2 maps. ]
  Cate, J.M. (1963). Revision of Dall's Hawaiian mitrids with descriptions of three new species (Mollusca: Gastropoda). The Veliger. 6(1): 23-43, pls 5-8
 [httpsReeve, L. A. (1844-1845). Monograph of the genus Mitra. In: Conchologia Iconica, or, illustrations of the shells of molluscous animals, vol. 2, pl. 1-39 and unpaginated text. L. Reeve & Co., London.]://biodiversitylibrary.org/page/8937231

leucozonias
Gastropods described in 1834